Pacification may refer to:

The restoration of peace through a declaration or peace treaty:
Pacification of Ghent, an alliance of several provinces of the Netherlands signed on November 8, 1576
Treaty of Berwick (1639), or Pacification of Berwick, signed on June 18, 1639 between England and Scotland
Pacification sejm, one of several sessions of the Sejm, especially the one in 1736 concluding the civil war in the Polish–Lithuanian Commonwealth
Pacification of 1917, between religious and secular sects in the Netherlands

A military or police action:
Pacification of Algeria (1835-1903), French military operations which aimed to put an end to various tribal rebellions
Occupation of Araucanía (1861–1883), also Pacification of the Araucanía, the actions which led to the incorporation of Araucanía into Chile
Pacification of Ukrainians in Eastern Galicia (1930), a punitive action of Polish police against the Ukrainian minority in Poland
Pacification of Manchukuo, a campaign during the Second Sino-Japanese War (March 1932-1941)
Pacification operations in German-occupied Poland, the use of German military force to suppress Polish resistance during World War II
Pacification of Tonkin, a military and political campaign undertaken by the French in northern Vietnam
Pacification of Wujek, a strike-breaking action against miners in Katowice, Poland, 1981
Dutch intervention in Lombok and Karangasem or Pacification of Lombok in 1894
Pacification of Libya, a military against by the Royal Italian Army against the Libyan resistance

An analytic approach to understanding the security-industrial complex:

A military, political, economic, and social process of establishing or reestablishing control by a government over a population impacted and divided by insurgency.
 Hearts and Minds (Vietnam)
 Winning hearts and minds

A policing, military, political, economic, and social process of establishing or reestablishing control by a government over a population impacted by violent crime.
 Pacifying Police Unit (Rio State, Brazil)

Other meanings:
Violent Pacification an album by Dirty Rotten Imbeciles
Army of Cuban Pacification Medal, medal issued to members of the US occupation force in Cuba following the Spanish–American War (1906–1909)

See also
 Colonialism
 Counterinsurgency
 Gun boat diplomacy
 Imperialism
 Interventionism (politics)
 Pax imperia
 Peace (law)
 Peace enforcement
 Peacemaking
 Police action

pl:Pacyfikacja